Lambeth Field or "The Colonnades" was a college football, baseball, and track stadium for the University of Virginia, named for W. A. Lambeth.

References

Virginia Cavaliers football
1913 establishments in Virginia
Sports venues completed in 1913
1930 disestablishments in Virginia
American football venues in Virginia
Baseball venues in Virginia
College football venues
College baseball venues in the United States